Dirty Sexy Money is an American prime time drama television series created by Craig Wright. It ran on ABC from September 26, 2007, to August 8, 2009. The series was produced by Berlanti Television and ABC Studios. Wright served as an executive producer alongside Greg Berlanti, Bryan Singer, Matthew Gross, Peter Horton, and Josh Reims, with Melissa Berman producing.

The series revolves around lawyer and family man Nick George, portrayed by Peter Krause. When Nick's father mysteriously dies in a plane crash, he agrees to take his position as the Darling family's lawyer, while trying to discover who committed the murder. The Darlings, the richest family in New York, constantly rely on Nick to solve their problems. Nick struggles to balance his morals and family life while dealing with the demands of the Darlings.

Premise
The series revolves around Nick George, whose whole life has been lived in the shadow of the Darling family, but as an adult he's leading a simple life as an idealistic lawyer, until his father's suspicious death. The wealthy Darlings of New York have asked him to take over his father's job as their personal lawyer, but the money that will allow him the freedom to be an altruistic do-gooder is only part of the picture. That same money pulls him into the dubious doings of the Darling clan.

Due to the cancellation of the show, the running plot line of the mystery of Dutch George will never be solved. Craig Wright told the Los Angeles Times that had the series lasted, Juliet would have been arrested after getting into a situation like that of Patty Hearst, later teaching drama at a boarding school in Connecticut, marrying the school's soccer coach and having kids.

Cast and characters

Main
Peter Krause as Nick George; A well-meaning, civic-minded lawyer in his 30s, Nick is a husband, father, and son to the Darling family attorney, Devlin "Dutch" George. Growing up in a troubled household (his mother left when he was six), he always came second to his father's job. Though he promised himself he would never follow in his father's footsteps, he is inevitably drawn to the Darling family when his father dies suddenly in a mysterious manner and agrees to be their chief counsel. However, he finds himself becoming more like the Darlings, while his marriage with Lisa George falls apart. Like his father before him, he delves deeper into dealings with Simon Elder as he believes him to be his father's killer. He forms a bond with Tripp and a considerable friendship with Patrick and, later in Season 2, Brian, his half brother. He is named vice-chairman on Darling Enterprises Board of Directors after Letitia is asked to step down. With the new partnership between Simon Elder and Tripp Darling not much on this new title has been developed. He and Lisa divorce in Season 2, after Lisa finds out that Nick still has feelings for his ex-girlfriend Karen Darling, and they undergo a custody battle for their daughter, Kiki. Nick and Karen confessed their feelings for each other, when their plane threatened to crash. In the season 2 finale, Nick and Karen are open to a future together, with them discussing having children and marriage.
Donald Sutherland as Patrick "Tripp" Darling III; The Darling family patriarch, now in his 60s, has amassed a wealth of such enormity that he owns vineyards and maintains residences around the world, including one in Upper East Side, Manhattan. With his wife, Letitia, they have raised five grown, troubled children: Patrick, Karen, Brian, Jeremy and Juliet. He runs the family's fifty billion dollar business, Darling Enterprises. 
Jill Clayburgh as Letitia Darling; The family matriarch, she is a socialite of formidable standing in New York City. Rendered devastated by Devlin George's death, the truth about the nature of their relationship comes to light when her daughter, Karen, reveals that they were engaged in a years-long affair. Letitia treated Nick George as her own son ever since Nick's mother left when he was a young child. Letitia always wanted Karen to marry Nick, as she was well aware the two had a relationship years ago, and still had feelings for each other. She co-ran the family business, Darling Enterprises, alongside Tripp, as vice-chairman of the Board.
William Baldwin as Patrick Darling IV; He is the firstborn child of Tripp & Letitia Darling. Now in his 40s, he is the New York State Attorney General married with two kids. A rising political star, he was elected to the United States Senate. He's also been having an affair with a transsexual. As his marriage begins to fall apart, Patrick becomes more determined to distance himself from his father and become his own man. He is elected senator of New York and later engages in another affair with a gay congressman's wife.
Natalie Zea as Karen Darling; The eldest daughter in the Darling family, with four failed marriages under her belt. She possesses an MBA from Columbia University, as well as running the family's charitable foundation. Nick and Karen were romantically involved at one point in time when they were younger (she lost her virginity to him). Nick proposed to Karen in Italy when they were both 19. They never ended up getting married, making Karen resent the fact that it didn't turn out that way. She later begins a relationship with Simon Elder so she can spy for her father, but ends up forming slight feelings for him, alienating her from the rest of her family. Her relationship with Simon ends when he trades her for a business deal with Tripp on their wedding day. She later finds out that she is pregnant with Simon's baby, but loses it in a miscarriage when she falls down the stairs at the Darling house. Karen starts a relationship with Nick in Season 2.
Glenn Fitzgerald as Brian Darling Sr.; The middle child of the Darling family. In his 30s, he is an Episcopal priest, even though he has an illegitimate child who he won't admit is his. He loathed Nick George as a child, which continued when Nick first started working with the family. He and his first wife, Mei Ling, divorce when she finds out he has an illegitimate child, Brian Jr., and marries Andrea later, a cancer survivor. Andrea throws Brian out when she finds out that he went to DC for a tryst with his ex-wife and he turns to Nick for help. The two bond and the animosity is lessened between them. He resigns from Darling Enterprises after a position of vice-chairman which he believed was supposed to be given to him went to Nick, also with the partnership between Tripp and Simon Elder. He rejoins the church after Andrea becomes healthy again.
Seth Gabel as Jeremy Darling; Juliet's twin brother and the youngest member of the Darling family. Addicted to cocaine, he is frequently seen hung over, chain-smoking and pleading with Nick George to get him out of a jam. Completely oblivious to other people's suffering and unable to imagine a life worse than his, Jeremy often fears that he is the family disappointment and that his father abhors him. Jeremy gets involved with Nola Lyons, who, under Simon Elder's instructions, is prosecuting Letitia Darling. He pretends to have amnesia in order to hide from Simon Elder to help Nola save her brother.
Samaire Armstrong as Juliet Darling (season 1); Jeremy's twin sister and the youngest member of the Darling family. In her 20s. she is spoiled and petulant (albeit with a heart). A former debutante, she was aiming to be taken seriously as an actress and was later devastated to learn that she only received the role of Susy Hendrix in the play "Wait Until Dark" because her father was bankrolling the production. After season 1, she leaves New York to vacation abroad with her new boyfriend.
Zoe McLellan as Lisa George; The first wife of Nick George. She's an attractive art dealer with a daughter, Kiki. Lisa enjoys the frequent, lavish parties that the Darlings throw in which she is now privy to. Despite their newfound wealth, Lisa is also aware of the fact that her husband might be drifting away from her and growing closer to his old flame, Karen Darling. She begins a short-lived romantic entanglement with Jeremy Darling, which ultimately leads to the destruction of her marriage. Lisa writes a tell-all book about the Darlings, much to Nick's chagrin, but her plan backfires when she ends up looking like a bitter, money-crazed ex-wife on daytime television. 
Blair Underwood as Simon Elder; The world's third-richest man, thanks to his invention of a superfast computer processor, but he couldn't be more different from the Darling family. He lives very simply in a mostly empty loft, and is engaged in a continuous war with the Darlings for the ownership of the island of Manhattan. His hatred of the Darlings stems from the past. A rumour started that Simon's father was having an affair with Tripp's mother. Things escalated and resulted in Devlin George reporting them to the State Department. The result was that they had to flee to Russia, Simon was told that Russia was more "sensitive to the plight of African Americans". However, it did not work out and they ended in a Siberian Work Camp where they died. Simon incorrectly blames the Darlings for their deaths. He later embarks on a partnership with Tripp regarding a bio-fuel he supposedly developed, but was the idea of Nola Lyons' father, his old college professor.
Lucy Liu as Nola Lyons (season 2); A powerful attorney who has never lost a case. She was the prosecutor in the Devlin George murder trial with a strong dislike for the Darlings. Despite this, she began an affair with Jeremy Darling, which ultimately cost her the case when it came to light. It is revealed that she is working with Simon Elder to take down the Darlings after her career falls apart, and convinces Patrick Darling to make her his Chief of Staff under Simon's orders. Though she occasionally shows signs of remorse, she is motivated by the safety of her younger brother, whom Simon is holding hostage.

Broadcast history
The series premiered in the United States on September 26, 2007, on ABC following the Grey's Anatomy spin-off, Private Practice, airing on Wednesday nights at 10:01 P.M. Eastern/9:01 P.M. Central.
On November 16, 2007, ABC ordered a full 22-episode season for the show, making it the first show to receive a full season order since the WGA writers' strike began on November 5, 2007. However, in the end, the first season comprised only 10 episodes due to the strike. Dirty Sexy Money: The Complete First Season, a three-disc DVD set including all 10 original episodes and exclusive bonus features including bloopers, audio commentary, deleted scenes, and featurettes,
and more, was released on September 16, 2008. The second season premiered on October 1, 2008, ten months after the first-season finale.

On November 20, 2008, ABC decided not to order any additional episodes for the 2008–2009 TV season. On December 10, 2008, Billy Baldwin appeared on NBC's Today Show asking for fans to support the show by watching the show and by visiting the ABC website and sending nice messages of support to the ABC executives. He said the show was not canceled, but on hiatus until ABC knew how the midseason replacement shows fared. All cast and sets continued to be contracted and on hold. The last scheduled episode of Dirty Sexy Money aired on December 17, 2008, while four episodes remained unaired in the USA though they were broadcast elsewhere.

After Dirty Sexy Money was officially canceled, ABC announced the series would return on Saturday, July 18, 2009, at 10:00 P.M. Eastern/9:00 P.M. Central. The final episode, "The Bad Guy", aired on August 8, 2009, and the second season came out on DVD on August 18, 2009.

International distribution
The series premiered in the United Kingdom on March 21, 2008, at 9 P.M. on Channel 4. Dirty Sexy Money was on hiatus due to the WGA writers' strike as of January 9, 2008, the date on which replacement series Cashmere Mafia assumed the time slot. Men in Trees, which has a total of 11 filmed unaired episodes available, assumed the slot on February 27, 2008, potentially for the balance of the spring season.

The show will be broadcast on Turner Network Television in Spain, Studio 23 in Philippines, Dizimax in Turkey and Nelonen in Finland. The series is being broadcast on the satellite/cable channel TNT in Spain since January 2008.

In Canada, CTV first aired the show on Sundays at 10 P.M. (four days after ABC), then it moved to 7 P.M.  CTV then moved the show to its secondary A system effective October 24, 2007 where it airs it in simulcast Wednesdays at 10 P.M.

In Australia, the Seven Network began airing Season One on Monday February 11, 2008 at 9:30 P.M. Season Two began on December 2, 2008, initially at 9:30 P.M., but due to low ratings, it was pushed back to 11:30 P.M. The Seven Network in Australia has aired all episodes of Season 2 that were unaired in the USA. Also Kanal 5 in Sweden aired the episodes, the last one on March 18, 2009.

New Zealand's TV2 started airing the show Wednesday nights at 9:30 P.M., beginning February 6, 2008.

In the United Kingdom, Channel 4 began airing the episodes on Friday, March 21, 2008, at 9:00 P.M. Channel 4 began airing the second season on March 8, 2009, on E4 in the 11 o'clock timeslot. Because of its cancellation in the US and low ratings for its first season in the UK there will be no new shows on Channel 4 for the foreseeable future. However, Season 2 commenced airing on E4 in a new time slot. For Season One it aired Tuesday nights at 9:00 P.M., whereas for Season Two it aired on Sunday nights at 11 P.M. between March 8 and May 31, 2009, including the four episodes not yet shown in the US.

In Ireland RTÉ One began airing the program on Friday, August 1, 2008, at 00:05.

In Latin America, the series began broadcasting on February 12, 2008, on the AXN channel, season 2 will begin broadcast on February 3, 2009.

In South Africa, the series began in December and the full series has been aired on the local satellite or analog channel M-Net. M-Net has broadcast the remaining episodes of Season 2 which followed on from the Organ Donor episode which aired on January 29, 2009. The series aired on Thursday nights at 8:30 p.m. with a repeat on Sundays at 2:00 p.m. The season finale has aired on February 5, 2009.

The first season premiered in Greece on Fox life on Wednesday December 3. All 10 episodes aired.

In Israel, the series was launched under the name "Money, Darling" on July 7, 2008, on Yes Stars Drama. Season 2 premiered on February 16, 2009, with all 13 episodes confirmed to air consecutively, including those not aired in the US.

In Hong Kong, the series was premiered Thursday nights at 10:30 P.M. on July 17, 2008, on the mainly English free-to-air network TVB Pearl with bilingual audio in both English and Cantonese and widescreen on the same channel in Digital. Series 2 is due to air on March 26, 2009, at the same time-slot. Same as the rest of the world, Hong Kong also aired the unaired episodes before the US on May 28, 2009, starting with the thanksgiving recap episode "The Facts".

In Norway, the show premiered on TV Norge on November 12, 2008.

In Estonia, the show premiered on TV3 in summer 2009.

In Russia, the show premiered on 1TV in summer 2008. Two seasons were shown in summer of 2009. The series launched under the name "Dirty Wet Money". In 2012 the show was aired late at nights on Domashny channel.

The show is broadcast on Fox Life in Bulgaria.

In Greece, the show premiered on cable FOX Life in February 2009 and season 2 premiered in October 2009. The show also will premiered on ANT1 on 2010.

In France, the show premiered on Canal+ pay TV in 2008 and the second season was aired from 2009 until Feb 11, 2010.

In Slovenia, the show's 1st season aired on Mondays on POP TV, It reaired on POP TV's new sister channel POP BRIO in September 2010, after the reruns the 2nd season premiered in the same time slot (Monday–Friday at 10 P.M.).

In Republic of Macedonia, the show aired Sundays at 12:00 P.M. in 2008 on A1 television, and later on Fox Life.

Marketing

Promotion
Using publicity from Paris Hilton's jail sentence controversy, ABC placed full-page advertisements in the Los Angeles Times and The New York Post that read: "We love Paris. The Darling Family." Later, an airplane towing a banner with the same message flew above the downtown courthouse on June 8 during Hilton's subsequent hearing. The network has also placed fake advertisements on popular gossip blog Perezhilton.com on August 6, 2007 "denouncing" the diva-like behavior of Samaire Armstrong's character, Juliet Darling, among others.

The song "Beautiful, Dirty, Rich" by singer Lady Gaga was used during advertisements for the show. Clips from the show were also used in an alternate version of the music video

Episodes

Season 1 (2007)

Season 2 (2008–09)

Home media
Walt Disney Studios Home Entertainment released both seasons on DVD in Regions 1, 2 and 4 in 2008/2009.  The region 1 releases have been discontinued and are now out of print.

On February 9, 2012, it was announced that Lionsgate Home Entertainment had acquired the rights to the series and plan on re-releasing it.  Seasons 1 and 2 was re-released on May 1, 2012.

References

External links

NYPost Review

2007 American television series debuts
2009 American television series endings
2000s American comedy-drama television series
2000s American satirical television series
American Broadcasting Company original programming
English-language television shows
Television series by ABC Studios
Television shows set in New York City
Transgender-related television shows
Mass media portrayals of the upper class